Libra (Pound) is a Julio Iglesias album released in 1985. The album was his first to reach number-one on the Latin Pop Album charts. Around this time, Iglesias returned to his roots, singing in his native Spanish again, although it had one English-language track, his version of Cole Porter's legendary classic "I've Got You Under My Skin". It was released as a single, and became a minor hit around Europe.

Track listing

Charts

Weekly charts

Year-end charts

Certifications

References

Bibliography

 

1985 albums
Julio Iglesias albums